Jornal da Tarde, often abbreviated JT, was a daily newspaper in São Paulo, Brazil. The paper was published by Grupo Estado, the owner of other prominent Brazilian news media such as O Estado de S. Paulo and Rádio Eldorado. It was founded in 1966 by the journalist Mino Carta in an attempt to introduce new journalism to Brazil.

The paper folded on 31 October 2012.

Editors
 Ivan Ângelo, 1966–1968
 Murilo Felisberto, 1968–1978

References

External links
 Official website

1966 establishments in Brazil
2012 disestablishments in Brazil
Defunct newspapers published in Brazil
Mass media in São Paulo
Portuguese-language newspapers
Publications established in 1966
Publications disestablished in 2012
Daily newspapers published in Brazil